This is a list of notable sculptors from, or associated with, Croatia, in alphabetical order:



A 
Andrija Aleši (1425–1505)
Kosta Angeli Radovani (1916–2002)
Antun Augustinčić (1900–1979)

B
Robert Baća (born 1949)
Vojin Bakić (1915–1992)
Lujo Bezeredi (1898–1979)
Tatiana Bezjak (born 1971)
Slavko Brill (1900–1943)
Ivan Budislavić (15th century)
Andrija Buvina (13th century)

D
Ante Dabro (born 1938)
Vera Dajht-Kralj (1928–2014)
Juraj Dalmatinac/George the Dalmatian (c. 1410–1473)
Josip Demirović Devj (1939-1999)
Branislav Dešković (1883-1939)
Ivan Duknović (c.1440–c.1514)
Dušan Džamonja (1928–2009)

F
Ivan Fijolić (born 1976)
Vera Fischer (1925-2009) 
Robert Frangeš-Mihanović (1872–1940)

G
Ivo Grbić (born 1931)

I
Sanja Iveković (born 1949)

J
Hinko Juhn (1891–1940)

K
Ivo Kerdić (1881–1953)
Albert Kinert (1919–1987)
Ivan Klapez (born 1961)
Oja Kodar (born 1941)
Kuzma Kovačić (born 1952)
Ivan Kožarić (born 1921)
Miroslav Kraljević (1885–1913)
Frano Kršinić (1897-1982)

L
Vasko Lipovac (1931–2006)
Zvonimir Lončarić (1927–2004)

M
Rudolf Matutinović (1927–2014)
Ivan Meštrović (1883–1962)
Ivan Milat-Luketa (1922–2009)

N
Oscar Nemon (1906–1985)

P
Ivan Picelj (1924–2011)
Dimitrije Popović (born 1951)

R
Vanja Radauš (1906–1975)
Vjekoslav Vojo Radoičić (1930–2017)
Radovan (master) (13th century)
Ivan Rendić (1849–1932)
Simeon Roksandić (1874–1943)
Toma Rosandić (1878–1958)
Branko Ružić (1919–1997)

S
Ivan Sabolić (1921–1986)
Stella Skopal (1904-1992)
Petar Smajić (1910–1985)
Aleksandar Srnec (1924-2010)
Marin Studin (1895–1960)

T
Lavoslav Torti (1875–1942)

U
Marija Ujević-Galetović (born 1933)

V
Maksimilijan Vanka (1889–1963)
Romolo Venucci (1903–1976)
Franjo Vranjanin (Laurana) (c. 1430–1502)

See also
 List of painters from Croatia
 List of Croatian artists
 List of Croatian architects

External links 

 Zvonimir Kamenar biography in the Croatian Biographical Lexicon
 Sculptor Ivan Mirković exhibition in Pag, Croatia
 Sculptor Miroslav Župančić exhibition in Varaždin
 Zvonko Car, Croatian sculptor
 Slavomir Drinković, Croatian sculptor
 Stjepan Gračan biography 
 Jamnić Gallery in Lepoglava
 Mila Wood short biography

Sculptors
 
Sculptors
Croatian sculptors